Budenheim is a municipality in the Mainz-Bingen district in Rhineland-Palatinate, Germany. Unlike other municipalities in Mainz-Bingen, it does not belong to any Verbandsgemeinde.

Geography

Location 

The Municipality of Budenheim is the only Verbandsgemeinde-free municipality in Mainz-Bingen. The municipality lies in Rhenish Hesse, 9 km west of Rhineland-Palatinate's capital Mainz, and is bordered by the north-flowing Rhine and the Lennebergwald (forest) on the residential community's south and west.

Greatest elevation 
Budenheim's greatest elevation is the Lenneberg at 176.8 m, which is in the Lennebergwald. At this spot stands the Lennebergturm (tower), dedicated in 1880 and belonging to the Wander- und Lennebergverein Rheingold Mainz e. V. (a hiking club).

History 
Budenheim had its first documentary mention – albeit undated – as Butenheim in the Lorsch codex in a listing of the Lorsch Abbey’s holdings in and around Mainz (Urkunde-Nr. 1977); this was the municipality’s only mention therein.

Politics

Town council 
The council is made up of 25 council members, counting the fulltime mayor, with seats apportioned thus:

(as at municipal election held on 26 May 2019)

Town partnerships 
 Eaubonne, Val-d'Oise, France
 Isola della Scala, Province of Verona, Veneto, Italy
 Wiesmoor, Aurich district, Lower Saxony

The third place listed here is a town in East Frisia with which Budenheim fosters “friendly relations”.

Coat of arms 
The municipality's arms might be described thus: Gules on a base sable Saint Pancras in armour with a sword on his belt all argent, in his hand dexter a flagpole argent bendwise flying from which the banner of Saint Pancras, argent a cross gules, standing on his foot sinister a shield argent charged with a cross gules.

Heraldry of the World shows a different coat of arms for Budenheim, with the same charges but in different tinctures. The shield at Saint Pancras's foot, for instance, is Or (gold), including the cross with which it is charged, and the cross on Saint Pancras's banner is sable (black) instead of gules (red). Heraldry of the World also shows a proposed coat of arms for Budenheim put forth in 1956, which apparently failed to win any great support. It is charged with Saint Pancras's banner only on an azure (blue) field and with a golden flagpole.

Saint Pancras is Budenheim's patron saint, which explains why he was chosen as a charge for the municipality's arms. The arms are based on a 16th-century village seal, and the tinctures are those from the arms borne by Electoral Mainz. These were chosen as no traditional tinctures were known.

Palaeontological finds

The Budenheim Rhinoceros 
In 1911, the most important and finest specimen of a rhinoceros, some 20 million years old from the Miocene, was unearthed in Budenheim. The fossil is displayed at the Senckenberg Museum in Frankfurt. It is a complete specimen, 85 cm tall, of the subspecies Dicerorhinus tagicus moguntianus. This is a forerunner to the Sumatran Rhinoceros (Dicerorhinus sumatrensis), which reaches a shoulder height of 110 to 150 cm, and which is also now threatened with extinction. Crocodile fossils have also been unearthed in Budenheim. At the Naturhistorisches Museum Mainz stands a copy of the 20,000,000-year-old rhinoceros presented as the Budenheimer Nashorn (“Budenheim Rhinoceros”) in view of the place where it was found.

Culture and sightseeing

Regular events

Budenheimer Blütenfest 
The Budenheim Flower Festival has since 1955 been celebrated at the onset of the blossoming season each year on the last weekend in April by choosing a Flower Queen. There are also two Flower Princesses to go with the Queen, and for one year they represent the Municipality of Budenheim on special occasions.

Budenheimer Straßenfest 

The Budenheim Street Festival had its beginnings in the municipality's 1,200-year jubilee in 1978. This folk festival is staged by the association of Budenheim's clubs along with the individual clubs therein. The festival is held over four days and includes the last weekend in the Rhineland-Palatinate summer holidays.

Budenheimer Kerb 
The Budenheim kermis (church consecration festival) goes back to the consecration of the Catholic Saint Pancras's Church (Pankratiuskirche) on 3 September 1747 and is likewise held over four days, each year over the third weekend in September.

Economy and infrastructure 
The Chemische Fabrik Budenheim belongs to Dr. August Oetker KG and for decades has been a world leader in manufacturing phosphoric acid and phosphates. For years, “the Budenheim” has been shorthand in international communication for this chemical plant and has taken the municipality's name throughout the world.

Transport 
The Autobahn A 643 can be reached through the Mainz-Mombach interchange about 4 km away.
Budenheim is a stop for local trains on Deutsche Bahn’s West Rhine Railway. Travel time to the main railway station in Mainz ranges from 6 to 10 minutes (as of June 2006).
Budenheim is the last stop on the route of the city bus run by the Mainzer Verkehrsgesellschaft (“Mainz Transport Association”). Travel time to the main railway station in Mainz is 29 minutes (as of June 2006).

Documents 
 Bild von Budenheim aus J.F. Dielmann, A. Fay, J. Becker (Zeichner): F.C. Vogels Panorama des Rheins, Bilder des rechten und linken Rheinufers, Lithographische Anstalt F.C. Vogel, Frankfurt 1833

References

External links 

 Municipality’s official webpage 
 Information about Budenheim 

Mainz-Bingen